Streblorrhiza speciosa was a perennial shrub endemic to Phillip Island.  A species of legume in the family Fabaceae, and the sole species of the genus Streblorrhiza, it is now presumed extinct.

The plant was first described by Stephan Endlicher in 1833, using two specimens collected by Ferdinand Bauer as the type for a new monotypic genus. One of these is the only known fruiting specimen.

The species became extinct in 1860 in its native habit, but the plant was known to have been cultivated. An appeal was made in 2007 to discover the plant in historic gardens. The species was declared extinct worldwide in 1998. A DNA study found it to be most closely related to Carmichaelia, Clianthus, Montigena and Swainsona.

References

Galegeae
Flora of Norfolk Island
Extinct flora of Australia
Fabales of Australia
Plants described in 1833
Plant extinctions since 1500
Taxonomy articles created by Polbot